Zhou Wenzhong may refer to:

Zhou Wenzhong (diplomat) (born 1945), Chinese diplomat 
Chou Wen-chung (born 1923), or Zhou Wenzhong, Chinese American composer of contemporary classical music